Marhemetabad-e Shomali Rural District is in the Central District of Chaharborj County, West Azerbaijan province, Iran. At the National Census of 2006, its population (as a part of the former Marhemetabad District of Miandoab County) was 9,021 in 2,255 households. There were 10,294 inhabitants in 2,803 households at the following census of 2011. At the most recent census of 2016, the population of the rural district was 10,146 in 3,014 households. The largest of its 21 villages was Qepchaq, with 3,669 people. Marhemetabad District was separated from Miandoab County, elevated to the status of Chaharborj County, and divided into two districts in 2020.

References 

Rural Districts of West Azerbaijan Province

Populated places in West Azerbaijan Province